Clifton Beach, also known as Sea View, is a beach in Karachi, Sindh, Pakistan and is located on the Arabian Sea. It stretches from Karachi to Ormara (Balochistan). The beach is very popular in Pakistan. It is open 24/7 for the general public.

Karachi is the most prominent coastal city of Pakistan and beach lovers here have many opportunities to visit different beaches bordering the Arabian Sea. Clifton Beach is purported to give the best value in leisure and recreational opportunities for fun seekers and beach lovers. 

In recent times, the area surrounding the beach has seen massive commercial activity as it is located in one of the most sought after localities in Karachi. 
The beach is now home to multiple local leisure activities including camel rides, buggy rides, horse rides, plastic plane flying among others. The Seaview Apartments across from the beach is a gated residential area which is rated among the top properties in the city. Other apartments and villas which can be seen along the Clifton beach coasts are becoming popular as well.

Restaurants and entertainment 
Previously, Clifton Beach had only had a few small shops known as "Corniche Points", where visitors could buy things like mineral water, samosas, chai and other foodstuffs. 

Now, Clifton Beach offers a variety of restaurants, including a McDonald's,  and is bustling with and a multitude of vendors that entertain visitors.
Do Darya restaurant is located further away from the main beach area but is still one of the hottest dining spots in Karachi. Extensive further revitalization is being planned.

Events
Clifton Beach is one of Karachi's major tourist attractions so most notable celebrations are done here by the citizens. A major event of the year is the New Year's celebration on the eve of 31 December each year. Also, the Pakistan Air Force now holds regular shows on Clifton Beach on important national events. These air shows consist of planes from the PAF showing acrobatics and flypasts to the audiences.

Attempts At Beautification & Uplift 
In 2003 it was noted that historic sites were deteriorating because of government neglect and lack of sanitation facilities for tourists. The monuments at risk included Lady Lloyd Pier, Jehangir Kothari Pavilion and his bungalow, Jehangir Kothari Parade, and the Katrak bandstand. In 2005, Clifton Beach Park was opened as part of the renovation of the historic Kothari Parade and Bagh Ibn-i-Qasim. In recent times, the local government and civil society has tried to make the place beautiful and tourist-friendly again. Attempts include the installation of themed dustbins in the shape of Giant Fish and cleanup campaigns by local civil society members. There have also been a few urban forests such as Clifton Urban Forest planted to improve the conditions and beauty of the area.

Background
Clifton Beach is considered as the most popular beach in Karachi. It was affected by an oil spill in 2003. A wreckage and cargo of dhow caused the oil spill and polluted the beach; the crew members of the wrecked dhow were rescued by the Pakistan Maritime Security Agency]. The beach was closed for three days for removal of hay bales and cargo wreckage in the water. In 2005, the beach was revamped and upgraded.

Gallery

See also 
 List of beaches in Pakistan

References

External links
Clifton Beach, Karachi - Pakistan

Beaches of Karachi
Seaside resorts in Pakistan
Clifton, Karachi